The Nigeria Postmaster General (PMG) is the chief executive officer of the Nigerian Postal Service (NIPOST). The PMG is responsible for managing and directing the day-to-day operations of the agency.

The PMG is selected and appointed by the Governing Council of the Nigeria Postal Service, the members of which are appointed by the President of Nigeria, with the advice and consent of the Nigeria Senate. The Postmaster General then also sits on the board as a member. The PMG can be dismissed by the Board of Governors.

The current officeholder is Adebayo Adewusi, who was appointed in December 2019.

List of postmasters general

References 

Postal system of Nigeria